Franklin Delano Selvy (born November 9, 1932) is an American former National Basketball Association (NBA) player who is best known for holding the record for the most points (100) in a Division I college basketball game. Born in Corbin, Kentucky, Selvy was an All-State basketball player at Corbin High School and was a teammate of College Football Hall of Fame inductee Roy Kidd. Selvy was the No. 1 overall pick in the 1954 NBA draft and was a two-time NBA All-Star, playing nine seasons.

Early life
Selvy attended Corbin High School and was raised in Corbin, Kentucky. He played basketball for Coach Harry Taylor, as did older brother Curt and younger brother Edd.

College career

After a storied career at Corbin High School, Selvy attended Furman University, where he was two time Southern Conference Player of the Year. Selvy, chose Furman after Kentucky's Adolph Rupp and Western Kentucky's E.A. Diddle refused him a scholarships, due to his then 6'0" height and small frame.

After Selvy grew three inches and was named MVP in the Kentucky East-West all-star game, Kentucky offered a scholarship, but Selvy had committed himself to play at Furman, "I liked Coach Alley," Selvy said. "He came up and talked to my mother. Plus there were two or three guys from Corbin High who came along with me."

In 1951-1952, Selvy averaged 24.6 points per game as Furman finished 18-6 under Coach Lyles Alley. In 1952-1953, Selvy averaged 29.5 points as Furman finished 21-6.

As a senior in 1953-1954, as Furman finished 20-9, Selvy averaged 41.7 points per game, scoring 1,209 total points to lead the NCAA in scoring for the second season in a row.

Overall, in 78 career games, Selvy averaged 32.5 points at Furman.

100-point college game
Selvy is best remembered for scoring 100 points in a college game for Furman University against Newberry College on February 13, 1954, the only NCAA Division I player ever to do so. (Jack Taylor of Division III Grinnell College holds the NCAA all-time record for points scored at 138.) Selvy's 100-point game was played towards the end of his final collegiate season on a night that Furman coach Lyles Alley had designated the game "Frank Selvy Night."  The special night was planned to garner recognition for Selvy, who was already certain to finish the season leading the nation in scoring and earn first-team All-American honors, two accomplishments he had attained the year before.  The game was the first to be broadcast live on television in South Carolina (where Furman is located and where the game was being played) and a large contingent from Selvy's hometown, including his family, had made the six-hour trek just for the occasion.  It was actually the first college game his mother saw him play.  The instructions from Coach Alley were simply to get the ball to Selvy so he can score as much as possible.  Selvy obliged, hitting 41 of 66 field goals and 18 of 22 free throws, his last two points coming on a desperate heave near midcourt at the buzzer.  (The game was played well before the introduction of the three-point line; Selvy later estimated that eight or nine of his shots that day would have been three-pointers today.

NBA career
Selvy was drafted first overall by the Baltimore Bullets in the 1954 NBA draft. He went on to play nine seasons in the National Basketball Association during the late 1950s and early 1960s, interrupted by a stint in the U.S. Army. As a professional, Selvy is mostly known for his time with the Los Angeles Lakers, teaming with Jerry West and Elgin Baylor. He was twice an NBA All-Star.

Drafted No. 1 overall by the Bullets, Selvy quickly moved to the Milwaukee Hawks on November 28, 1954, as the Baltimore franchise was folded. Selvy was drafted by Milwaukee in the dispersal draft of Baltimore players. Selvy averaged 19.0 points as a rookie as the Hawks finished 29-46 under Red Holzman.

The Hawks moved to St. Louis, Missouri in 1955-1956 and Selvy averaged 11.0 points, as future Naismith Hall of Fame inductee Bob Pettit became the centerpiece of the 33-39 Hawks. Selvy then missed the 1956-1957 season to military service. with the U.S. Army.

In 1957-1958, Selvy played a reserve role as the St. Louis Hawks captured the 1958 NBA Championship, defeating the Boston Celtics in six games. Selvy missed a ring, as he was traded on February 16, 1958, by the Hawks to the Minneapolis Lakers for Dick Boushka and Terry Rand.

Selvy then played for the New York Knicks in 1958-1959, averaging 9.8 points per game for the 40-32 Knicks.

In 1959-1960, Selvy was waived by the Knicks On October 25, 1959, and quickly picked up on October 28, 1959, by the Syracuse Nationals. Then, On December 15, 1959, Selvy was sold by Syracuse to the Minneapolis Lakers. Subsequently, Selvy remained with the Lakers for last five seasons of his career. He averaged 10.7 points for the Lakers in their last season in Minneapolis. In 1960-1961, Selvy averaged 10.8 in the first season in Los Angeles, playing alongside Elgin Baylor and Jerry West, as the team advanced to the Western Conference Finals.

In 1961-1962, the Lakers finished 54-26 as Selvy averaged 14.7 points and the Lakers advanced to the 1962 NBA Finals, losing to the Boston Celtics in seven games. Selvy averaged 12.1 points, 4.7 rebounds and 4.0 assists in the Finals.

The Lakers advanced to the NBA Finals again in 1962-1963, with Selvy averaging 10.3 points, 3.6 rebounds and 3.5 assists per game. The Lakers again lost to the Celtics in six games in the Finals, with Selvy averaging 7.5 points in the series.

Selvy averaged 10.8 points, 3.7 rebounds and 2.8 assists in his nine-season NBA Career and played in the 1955 & 1962 NBA All-Star Games.

1962 NBA Finals, Game 7
Selvy's best known game in the NBA is probably Game 7 of the 1962 NBA Finals in which he almost defeated the Celtics. Selvy's Lakers faced a four-point deficit at the hands of Boston Celtics in the final minute of the game's fourth quarter. Selvy proceeded to secure two crucial rebounds and score two baskets in 20 seconds to tie the game at 100. With 5 seconds left, Selvy inbounded the pass at midcourt to Rodney "Hot Rod" Hundley, who dribbled to the top of the key. He pump-faked a pass to Jerry West, who was covered, then passed back to an open Selvy in the left corner. “I had one thought in my mind when the ball came to me: ‘Do I take the shot?’ I was wide open,” Hundley recalled. “I thought, ‘If I make it, I’ll be the mayor of L.A. But if I miss, they’ll be riding me out of town on a rail.’ So I elected to pass it to Frank.” However, Selvy lost his chance for the ultimate heroic moment as he missed a 12-foot jump shot right before the buzzer that would have secured the championship for the Lakers had it gone in. The miss sent the game to overtime, where the Celtics prevailed in this, the second of seven NBA Finals match-ups between Boston and Los Angeles over the course of eleven seasons.

Regrettably for Selvy, his missed shot gained even larger significance as those years went by because the Lakers ultimately lost every one of those championship battles with the Celtics, thus magnifying the pain of Los Angeles having lost a golden opportunity, with Selvy's shot, to end that streak of futility before it had even begun. (The Lakers, while still playing in Minneapolis, had lost to the Celtics in the NBA Finals in 1959, as well.)

The player who initially had the ball on that final play was Rod "Hot Rod" Hundley.  Selvy's miss, however, meant that Hundley's sacrifice had been for naught and that Hundley would never know if indeed he would have won the championship himself, had he taken the shot he had available. Because of this, Hundley would occasionally call Selvy and, when Selvy answered the phone, Hundley would simply say, "Nice shot!" and then hang up.  For his part, Selvy has expressed some degree of irritation at Hundley's teasing.

It was a fairly tough shot because I was almost on the baseline. But I would trade all my points for that last basket.
— Frank Selvy as quoted on NBA.com

Coaching career

After retiring from the NBA with multiple injuries, Selvy joined the Furman basketball staff as an assistant coach in 1964 under his former Coach Lyles Alley.

Selvy was hired to replace Alley as Head Coach at Furman beginning in the 1966–67 season. His Furman teams finished 9-15, 13-14, 9-17 and 13-13 in his four seasons. His brother, Charles Selvy, was a top player on his Furman teams. He was replaced as Head Coach by Joe Williams in 1970. Overall, Selvy led Furman to a 44-59 mark.

Later, Selvy was employed for 25 years with the St. Joe Paper Company.

Honors
 Selvy was the 1954 United Press National Player of the Year
 Consensus first-team All-American (1954)
 Consensus second-team All-American (1953)
 2 × NCAA Division I scoring leader (1953, 1954)
 2 × SoCon Player of the Year (1953, 1954)
 Selvy was a 1955 & 1962 NBA All-Star.
 In 2009, Selvy was a charter member inducted into the Southern Conference Hall of Fame.
 Selvy was a charter member of the Furman Athletic Hall of Fame (1981).
 Selvy's jersey number 28 is retired at Furman.
 Selvy is listed on the "Naismith Memorial Basketball Hall of Fame Eligible Candidates" for the Class of 2019.
 A street in Corbin, Kentucky is named "Frank Selvy Way".
 The Video Boards in Timmons Arena at Furman University have "Frank Selvy" adorned on them.

See also
 History of the Los Angeles Lakers
 List of basketball players who have scored 100 points in a single game
 List of NCAA Division I men's basketball players with 60 or more points in a game
 List of NCAA Division I men's basketball season scoring leaders

References

External links

The State – The Night He Scored 100
USA Today – 50 Years Since Selvy's 100

1932 births
Living people
All-American college men's basketball players
American men's basketball players
Baltimore Bullets (1944–1954) draft picks
Basketball coaches from Kentucky
Basketball players from Kentucky
Furman Paladins men's basketball coaches
Furman Paladins men's basketball players
Los Angeles Lakers players
Milwaukee Hawks players
Minneapolis Lakers players
National Basketball Association All-Stars
New York Knicks players
People from Corbin, Kentucky
Shooting guards
Small forwards
St. Louis Hawks players
Syracuse Nationals players